Maliqi may refer to:

Behar Maliqi (born 1986), Kosovar footballer
Shkelzen Maliqi (born 1947), Albanian philosopher
Sokol Maliqi (born 1981), Swiss footballer

See also
Maliq, Albania

Albanian-language surnames